Garrett "Rocky" Burnett (September 23, 1975 – April 11, 2022) was a Canadian professional ice hockey player who played with the Mighty Ducks of Anaheim of the National Hockey League in the 2003–04 season.

Playing career
Undrafted, Burnett played primarily in the then-named East Coast Hockey League (ECHL) before signing as a free agent with the San Jose Sharks of the National Hockey League (NHL) on June 2, 1998. Used solely as an enforcer, Burnett was largely a journeyman. In Burnett's minor league career, he amassed 2,562 penalty minutes for 13 different teams. In the 1999–2000 season, in only 58 games with the Kentucky Thoroughblades of the American Hockey League (AHL), he had 506 penalty minutes.

After signing with the Mighty Ducks of Anaheim on July 25, 2003, Burnett made his NHL debut in the 2003–04 season. Burnett's first career NHL goal came against Brent Johnson of the Phoenix Coyotes on March 17, 2004. The enforcer played 39 games and registered 184 penalty minutes while scoring one goal and adding two assists. Burnett participated in 22 fights in his sole NHL season with the Mighty Ducks of Anaheim. His reputation for having a "face of stone" was solidified in his March 19, 2004, fight against San Jose's Scott Parker, who sustained a broken hand from fighting Burnett.

Burnett signed an NHL one-way contract for the 2004–05 season plus a one-year option, but due to the 2004–05 NHL lockout only played briefly as the player-assistant coach for the Danbury Trashers of the United Hockey League (UHL) in 2004. Burnett became a free agent and was signed by the Dallas Stars for the 2005–06 season, in which he played for Dallas' minor league affiliates the Iowa Stars and Phoenix RoadRunners.

His last game played was in the Quebec-based Ligue Nord-Américaine de Hockey (LNAH) on December 17, 2006, playing for the Summum Chiefs. The league suspended him for throwing a net at an opposing player.

Two-sport athlete 
Burnett also tried his hand at lacrosse, signing with the Arizona Sting of the National Lacrosse League (NLL) in 2006, landing on their practice roster.  He had not played an NLL game as of the 2006 season. During the 2006 season he played lacrosse for the New Westminster Salmonbellies of the Western Lacrosse Association Vancouver.

Victim of assault
Burnett was assaulted in the early hours of December 26, 2006, inside and outside of a nightclub in North Delta, British Columbia.  He was in a coma in a Vancouver hospital. According to family, he was on life support and in a coma for three weeks and doing much better, yet he was also recovering/rehabilitating and being treated regularly as an outpatient four years later.  As of 2010, no charges had been laid in the incident.

In December 2008, Burnett sued the Delta Police Department and Corporation of Delta among others as well as the owners of the nightclub Cheers, and bouncers in relation to the 2006 incident.
In November 2011 Burnett lost his negligence lawsuit.

Death

Burnett died on April 11, 2022, at the age of 46.

Career statistics

References

External links
 

1975 births
2022 deaths
Canadian expatriate ice hockey players in the United States
Canadian ice hockey left wingers
Canadian lacrosse players
Cincinnati Mighty Ducks players
Cleveland Lumberjacks players
Danbury Trashers players
Hartford Wolf Pack players
Ice hockey people from British Columbia
Iowa Stars players
Jacksonville Lizard Kings players
Johnstown Chiefs players
Kentucky Thoroughblades players
Kitchener Rangers players
Knoxville Cherokees players
Mighty Ducks of Anaheim players
Nashville Knights players
New Haven Knights players
Oklahoma City Blazers (1992–2009) players
People from Coquitlam
Philadelphia Phantoms players
Phoenix RoadRunners players
Sault Ste. Marie Greyhounds players
Tulsa Oilers (1992–present) players
Undrafted National Hockey League players
United Hockey League coaches
Utica Blizzard players